Thomas Jefferson Cason (September 13, 1828 – July 10, 1901) was an American lawyer and politician who served two terms as a U.S. Representative from Indiana from 1873 to 1877.

Early life and career 
Born near Brownsville, Indiana, Cason moved to Boone County with his parents, who settled on a farm near Thorntown in 1832. He attended the common schools, and taught school in Boone County for several years. He studied law in Crawfordsville, Indiana to gain admission to the bar in 1850, commencing practice in Lebanon, Indiana.

Early political career 
He served as member of the Indiana House of Representatives from 1861 to 1864, and of the Indiana State Senate from 1864 to 1867. In April 1867, Governor Conrad Baker appointed Cason to be a common pleas judge of Boone County, to which office he was subsequently elected in October 1867 for a term of four years. He declined reelection in 1871, and resumed the practice of law.

Congress 
Cason was elected as a Republican to the Forty-third and Forty-fourth Congresses (March 4, 1873 – March 3, 1877). He was an unsuccessful candidate for renomination in 1876.

Later career and death 
After leaving office, he resumed the practice of law in Lebanon, Indiana.

He retired in 1897 and moved to Washington, D.C., where he died July 10, 1901. He was interred in Oak Hill Cemetery, Lebanon, Indiana.

References

1828 births
1901 deaths
Republican Party Indiana state senators
Republican Party members of the Indiana House of Representatives
Indiana lawyers
Indiana state court judges
People from Union County, Indiana
People from Thorntown, Indiana
People from Crawfordsville, Indiana
People from Lebanon, Indiana
19th-century American politicians
19th-century American judges
Republican Party members of the United States House of Representatives from Indiana